The Umana Yana (pronounced oo-man-a yan-na) is a conical palm thatched hut (benab) erected for the Non-Aligned Foreign Ministers Conference in Georgetown, Guyana in August 1972 as a V.I.P. lounge and recreation centre.

History
The Umana Yana is situated on Main Street next to the Le Meridien Pegasus Hotel, it is now a permanent and much admired part of Georgetown's scenery, and is in constant use as an exhibition and conference centre.

No nails were used. It was erected by a team of about sixty Wai-Wai Amerindians, one of the nine indigenous tribes of Guyana. Fashioned like the Wai-Wai benabs or shelters which are found deep in Guyana's interior, it occupies an area of 460 square metres, making it the largest structure of its kind in Guyana.

On April 7, 2001, the Umana Yana, along with the African Liberation Monument, was gazetted as one of Guyana's National Monuments. 

"Umana Yana" is a Wai-Wai word meaning "Meeting place of the people".

Renovated in 2010, on September 9, 2014 the Umana Yana was gutted by fire and destroyed. The government planned to rebuild the national landmark as soon as possible, with better ventilation and to correct electrical issues which are suspected in the earlier fire. Rebuilding started in late 2015 and was completed in 2016.

African Liberation Monument

On 26 August 1974, President Forbes Burnham unveiled the African Liberation Monument outside the benab "in memory of all of those who have struggled and continue to struggle for freedom from Human Bondage". The monument consists of five polished Greenheart logs encased in a jasper stand on a granite boulder.

References

External links

Aerial view

Buildings and structures completed in 1972
Event venues in Guyana
Buildings and structures in Georgetown, Guyana
National Monuments in Guyana